Red Bluff(s) may refer to several places in North America:

Places

Canada 
Red Bluff, British Columbia, a community near Quesnel, British Columbia, Canada
Red Bluff First Nation, a First Nations band government headquartered near Quesnel, British Columbia

United States 
Red Bluff, Arkansas, a former village in Jefferson County
Red Bluff, California, a city in and the county seat of Tehama County
Red Bluff, South Carolina, an unincorporated community in Marlboro County

Other uses 

Red Bluff (Mississippi landmark), a geologic formation in Mississippi
Red Bluff Reservoir, a reservoir on the Texas-New Mexico border

See also 

Red Bluff Creek (disambiguation)